Olga Stanislavovna Pogodina is a Russian actress most known for her work on several dozens of Russian TV series and movie pictures (including Russian-Italian films). She is also a film producer, screenwriter and a show host. 

She is a Merited Artist of the Russian Federation since 2009 and a People's Artist of Russia (highest Russian state title for artists) since 2017. Holds a number of Russian awards in Culture including Golden Eagle Award. Member of the Union of Cinematographers of the Russian Federation.

Biography 
Olga was born on September 21, 1976 in Moscow, USSR as Olga Stanislavovna Bobovich. Father is Stanislav Bobovich, a chief engineer at a factory, and the mother is Liya Pogodina, an actress.

Due to health problems in childhood, Olga could not attend secondary school normally, so her mother Liya had to give up actress career to maintain daughter's education at home for years. When finished, Olga received school graduation as external degree. At the age of 16, Olga decided to follow her mother's profession and went to Boris Shchukin Theatre Institute in Moscow.

The studies were hard for Olga: her leading teacher was set up against her considering her unsuitable for the profession. Every year the teacher, Marina Panteleeva, tried to drop her out of the institute, but the senior administration made her remain. Over the last year of studies, Panteleeva refused to involve Olga in graduation performances. Thus, as the only exception in the history of the Shchukin Institute, rehearsals with her were individually held by pro-rector Pyotr Popov and a teacher Vladimir Poglazov. Finally, in 1997 Olga successfully graduated with the highest marks.

Upon that, in 1998 she joined Moscow Theatre Center "Vishnevy Sad" headed by Honored Art-Worker of Russia Alexander Vilkin. For the role of Mariana in a play "Tartuffe" she was nominated to the award of the Union of Theatre Workers of the Russian Federation at the festival "Moscow's yearly debutes".

For many years, she collaborated with the theatre "Center for Drama and Directing" headed by Aleksei Kazantsev and Mikhail Roshchin. In 2006 she was a TV host at a social TV program called "Vremechko" at the channel TV Centre.

In 2007–2008 she also was a member of the Higher Council of the Russian political party "Civilian Power". 

She is the creator, co-founder and the Director General of the JSC "ODA Film Production" in Moscow which produces cinematographic movies, TV movies and TV shows. As a film producer, Olga created more than 10 movies some of those earned Russia's main TEFI TV award and "Golden Eagle" movie award.

Olga Pogodina is a member of the professional Union of Cinematographers of the Russian Federation.

Since 2013 Olga is married to Aleksei Pimanov, a well-known Russian director, producer, TV host and a top manager at Russia's major TV company called Channel One Russia.

Works

Theatre 
Role of Mariana in "Tartuffe" at Moscow Theatre Center "Vishnevy Sad" (1998). At "Center for Drama and Directing": roles in "Set-2" (2001), "Polovoe Pokrytie" (2002), "Moscow is an open city" (2002), director Olga Subbotina.

TV series and movies

As actress 
Over 80 roles (by 2020) at cinematographic movies, TV movies and TV series, including many leading roles. Among them are:

 2001 — movie "If your bride is a witch", dir. O. Fesenko — lead role Alisa Malkovich, Russia-1 (RTR)
 2001 — movie "Destiny crossroad", dir. S. Nikonenko — lead role Veronika, Channel One Russia (ORT)
 2001 — series "Beauty salon", dir. A. Polynnikov — lead role Zhenya, NTV
 2002 — series "Drongo", dir. Z. Roysman — secretary Lazareva, ORT
 2002 — series "Simple truths" — lead role Olga Borodina, chemistry teacher, RTR
 2002 — series "Line of defense", dir. L. Derbenev — role Clara, RTR
 2003 — movie "Golden age", dir. I. Hotinenko — role Countess Tolstaya, ORT
 2003 — series "Women's logic 2", dir. S. Ashkenazy — role Nina, the waitress, ORT
 2003 — series "Russian amazons", dir. I. Fridberg — role Elya, RTR
 2003 — movie "Ovid", dir. V.  Lagunov — lead role Polina Astahova, the painter
2003 — series "Taxi driver", dir. O. Muzaleva — role Ella, NTV
2003 — movie "Woman's intuition", dir. O. Bayrak — lead role Dasha, Alexandr's beloved, Masha's nanny, RTR
2003 — series "Five stars", dir. V. Konovalov — lead role Kristina Ignatova
2003–2007 — series "My Prechistenka", dir. B. Tokarev — lead role Clara Duro, the actress, George Nadein's wife
2004 — series "Road angel", dir.  I. Ishmukhamedov — lead role Victoria, Sergei's mistress
2004 — series "Firefighters", dir. I. Fridberg — lead role Elena, RTR
2004 — series "Twins", dir. Z. Roysman — role Sonia Kadkova 
 2004 — series "Jackpot for Cinderella", dir. N. Stambula — role Larisa
2004 — series "Muhtar's Return" (episode 35 "Alibi"), dir. А. Polyshnikov — lead role Sasha and Lisa (twins), RTR
2004 — movie "Kill me! Oh, please!", dir. O. Bayrak — lead role Valeria, Olympic champion in biathlon
2004 — movie "Woman's intuition 2", dir. O. Bayrak — lead role Dasha, Alexandr's wife,  Masha's stepmother
2004 — series "The oddities of love",  dir. М. Fatyanov — lead role Dunya, NTV
2004 — movie "To you, real", dir. O. Bayrak — role Jessika, RTR
2004 — movie "The bat", dir. O. Bayrak — role Ida, Adel's sister, Falk's beloved
2004 — movie "Taxi driver. Greenwich New year", dir. О. Muzaleva — role Ella
2005 — movie "Men's Season: The Velvet Revolution", dir. О. Stepchenko — role Office employee
2005 — series "Echelon", dir. N. Adominayte — lead role Erna
2005 — movie "A Girl from the North", dir. D. Mednov — Irena Bond-Bondareva
2005 — series "Deadly Force 6" (episode 7 "Profitable groom"), dir. А. Karpilovskiy — role Zina Arkhipova
2005 — series "To the rhythm of tango", dir. A.Pavlovskiy — lead role Olga Venevitova
2005 — movie "Inner Circle - Bodyguard", dir. V. Furmanov — lead role Natalia Belkovskaya, businessman's widow
2006 — movie "Make God laugh", dir. V. Kharchenko-Kulikovskiy — lead role Svetlana Golovanova, Stas's wife
2006 — series "Good bye, doctor Chekhov!", dir. Е. Sokolov — lead role Olga Knipper
2006 — series "Old-men crush, or Fantastic Four", dir. К. Smirnov — Violet, a journalist, lead role
2006 — movie "Three days in Odessa", dir. А. Pimanov — lead role Lida Sheremetieva
2006 — movie "Indigo children", dir. А. Mayorov, role Masha
2006 — series "Angel escapee", dir. О.Subotina, role Masha
2006 — series "Trap", dir. V. Krasnopolskiy — role Polina Krashevskaya
2006 — series "Railworkers" (episode 7 "No coincidence meeting"), dir. G. Baysak — Zoya, lead role
2006 — series "The limit of dreams", dir. V. Dmitrievskiy — role Elena Nesterenko
2007–2011 — series "Alert the press!", dir. V. Opalev — lead role Victoria Danilova
2008 — series "Legend of Olga", dir. К. Кapitca — lead role Olga Chekhova
2008 — movie "Distance", dir. B. Tokarev — lead role Rita
2009 — movie "A man in my head", dir. А. Pimanov  — lead role Alyona
2010 — series "Reflection", dir. А. Shurikhin — lead role Elisaveta Kruglova/Darya Eryomina
2010 — movie "Marry a millionaire", dir. V. Uskov — role Irina
2012 — movie "Entertainment", dir. R. Baltcer — lead role Nina
2012 — movie "Night of the lone owl", dir. G. Salgarelly — lead role Anna
2013 — series "Ludmila" dir. А. Pavlovskiy — role Anastassia
2014 — Russian-Italian movie "Elementary love" / "Amori elementari", dir. S. Basso — lead role Vera
2015 — series "Women's riot, or Novosyolkovo War", dir. U. Morozov — lead role Yulia
2015 — Russian-Italian movie "Love prêt-à-porter" / "Di tutti e colori", dir. М. Nardari, — lead role Olga, a russian girl
2015 — series "Vlasik. Stalin's shadow", dir. А. Muradov — lead role Asya Lemke
2016 — series "Margarita Nazarova", dir. К. Maximov — lead role Margarita Nazarova
2018 — movie "Tankers", dir. К. Maximov — lead role Paula, Semen Konovalov's wife
2019 — series "The Legend Of Ferrari", dir. К. Maximov — Elena Ferrari

As producer 
 2008 — series "Hate", dir. М. Shevchuk
 2008 — movie "Distance", dir. B. Tokarev
 2009 — movie "A man in my head", dir. А. Pimanov
 2012 — series "Reflection", dir. А. Shurikhin
 2012 — movie "Night of the lone owl", dir. G. Salgarelly
 2014 — series "Women's riot, or Novosyolkovo War", dir. U. Morozov
 2017 — Russian-Italian movie "Love prêt-à-porter" / "Di tutti e colori", dir. М. Nardari
 2016 — series "Margarita Nazarova", dir. К. Maximov
 2018 — movie "Tankers", dir. К. Maximov
 2019 — series "The Legend of Ferrari", dir. К. Maximov

Other 
Olga has a record of hosting public events such as award ceremonies which include Nika Award, the main annual national film award in Russia, concerts of notable artists such as Yan Arlazorov. She also starred in over 20 television advertisements, which included an ad for Russian duty-free shop system.

Awards and nominations

State titles 
 2009: Merited Artist of the Russian Federation (honorary title), for "merits in arts".
 2017: People's Artist of Russia (honorary title), for "big merits in arts".

Cultural awards 
 1998: nomination to the award of the Union of Theatre Workers of the Russian Federation at the festival "Moscow's yearly debuts" for role in Tartuffe.
 2005: Grand Prix of Eurasian Academy of Television and Radio's contest for the role in Echelon TV series.
 2009: nomination at TEFI award for best actress for the role in "Legend of Olga".
 2009: award for best actress for the role in "Goodbye, doctor Chekhov" at International Anton Chekhov Festival in Paris, France.
 2010: insignia "Labor Valor" (Russia) from homonymous non-governmental organization.
 2016: upon completion of the work on the role of Soviet circus artist Margarita Nazarova in the homonymous TV series, Olga Pogodina got a record in the "Book of Records of Russia". The achievement was: "for the shortest time of artist's preparation for a stunt of putting head into tiger's mouth" (4 days). The movie makers decided to re-create authentically the setting of Nazarova's circus performances, so the tigers had to get used to Olga personally, not stunt performers substituting her. Also the movie authors re-created water circus with tigers, which is especially dangerous as tigers in water may harm people unintentionally. Olga was working on her own there as well, and it was emphasized that there was the sole implementation of water circus with tigers since those times.
 2017: Golden Eagle Award for Best Leading Actress on Television for the leading role of Margarita Nazarova in the homonymous 2016 TV series.

References

Links 
 

People's Artists of Russia
Honored Artists of the Russian Federation
21st-century Russian actresses
1976 births
Living people